ACCP may refer to:

 American College of Clinical Pharmacy, a pharmacy organization for the promotion of clinical pharmacy
 American College of Correctional Physicians, a medical organization consisting of physicians and non-physician practitioners in the field of correctional (i.e. prisons and jails) medicine
 American Council for Cultural Policy, a group of antiquities dealers, collectors and lawyers who promote broader cultural exchange by influencing policy in the US
 In mathematics, ascending chain condition on principal ideals
 American College of Clinical Pharmacology, a professional organization promoting leadership and education among Clinical Pharmacology healthcare professionals
The U.S. Army's Army Correspondence Course Program